Al Agnew (born 1952) is an American naturalist painter known for his work capturing wildlife and scenery in realistic detail. "To view an Al Agnew original is to be given the gift of a moment suspended in time".

He and his wife Mary split their time between rural Ste. Genevieve County, Missouri and a log home in Paradise Valley, Montana. Al credits his wife with encouraging him to enter the 1983 Missouri Trout stamp competition. After winning the competition, Al left the teaching profession to devote himself to a professional career as a wildlife artist, with Mary acting as his business manager.

Artistic style 

Noted for the realism and detail he brings to his subjects, Agnew's paintings of North American predators, particularly wolves, first caught the eyes of collectors and galleries. Al Agnew's art has been on the covers of more than 125 Bass Pro Shop catalogues, and his art has appeared on several wildlife magazine covers including Outdoor Life, Field & Stream, Sporting Classics, and Fish and Game among others.

Agnew is notable for his attention to accuracy and authenticity, having studied various game fish species in detail, paying particular attention to their dramatic change in appearance under differing light conditions.

Early years 

Agnew grew up in the Missouri Ozarks, and developed his great appreciation for the outdoor there, becoming an avid fisherman and recognized for his knowledge of smallmouth bass. He received his degree in secondary education from Southeast Missouri State University at Cape Girardeau. As an art medium, Agnew began his career working in watercolors, transitioning to oils and acrylics midway through his career.

Conservation work 

An avid fisherman and conservationist, Agnew has served on advisory boards concerning river conservation issues and is active in the Smallmouth Alliance, a national organization devoted to preserving small mouth bass fisheries. He has donated artwork to several organizations for their fund raising efforts including the Wolf Education Task Force and the International Grizzly Bear Committee. Sales from three wolf posters raised more than a million dollars for the task force. Overall through specially commissioned artwork and his efforts as a conservationist, Agnew has raised millions of dollars to benefit wildlife through work with organizations such as Ducks Unlimited, The National Wild Turkey Federation, The Rocky Mountain Elk Foundation, the Black Bass Foundation and the Wolf Recovery project.

References 

1952 births
Living people
Place of birth missing (living people)
Painters from Missouri